John Seymour (by 1518 – 1552), of London, was an English politician.

He was a Member (MP) of the Parliament of England for Wootton Bassett in 1547.

References

1552 deaths
Politicians from London
English MPs 1547–1552
Year of birth uncertain